The Saipa 151 is a car produced by Saipa in Iran. It is a small  pickup made on the body of the Kia Pride (same as Mazda 121 and Ford Festiva). Saipa corporation classifies it as an economical class vehicle.

External links 
 SAIPA official website

Cars of Iran
Saipa vehicles
Cars introduced in 2011